"Blue Jeans" is a song by German dance-pop group Sqeezer. It was released in May 1996 as the second single from their debut album, Drop Your Pants (1996). The song was ranked at number 81 on the Eurochart Hot 100, and charted at number eight in the Czech Republic, number 16 in Germany and at number 28 in Austria. In 1997, it peaked at number 11 in Spain, on the Productores de Música de España chart.

Track listing

 Europe (Der Hit Mit Dem >>Drop Your Pants<<) CD-maxi
 "Blue Jeans" (Radio-/Video Hit-Single) – 3:48
 "Blue Jeans" (Dance-Radio Single) – 3:59
 "Blue Jeans" (Drop Your Pants Mix) – 5:25
 "Blue Jeans" (Hot Pants Maxi Mix) – 7:04
 "Blue Jeans" (Ola Ela Mix) – 5:17

 Germany (Drop Your Pants) (Summer Party Mix) CD-maxi
 "Blue Jeans" (New Radio Single) – 3:48
 "Blue Jeans" (Speedy Vespa Jeans Single) – 3:59
 "Blue Jeans" (Drop Your Pants Mix) – 7:55
 "Blue Jeans" (European Blue Jeans) – 5:31

 Germany vinyl 12"
 "Blue Jeans" (Drop Your Pants House-Mix) – 7:55
 "Blue Jeans" (New Radio Single) – 3:48
 "Blue Jeans" (European Blue Jeans) – 5:31
 "Blue Jeans" (Speedy Vespa Jeans Single) – 3:59

 Spain vinyl 12"
 "Blue Jeans" (European Blue Jeans) – 5:31
 "Blue Jeans" (Drop Your Pants Mix) – 5:25

 Europe (New French Hit Version) CD-maxi
 "Blue Jeans" (Franzosische Radio Version) – 3:48
 "Blue Jeans" (Dance-Radio Single) – 3:59

 Spain 
 "Blue Jeans" (Radio-/Video Hit-Single) – 3:48
 "Blue Jeans" (Dance-Radio Single) – 3:59
 "Blue Jeans" (European Blue Jeans) – 5:31
 "Blue Jeans" (Drop Your Pants Mix) – 5:25
 "Blue Jeans" (Ola Ela Mix) – 5:17

Charts

Weekly charts

Year-end charts

References

1996 singles
1996 songs
EMI Records singles
English-language German songs
Sqeezer songs